Rockbridge or Rock Bridge may refer to:

Geological features and parks
A Natural arch
 Rock Bridge Memorial State Park, Missouri
 Rockbridge State Nature Preserve, Ohio

Places
United States
 Rockbridge, Georgia
 Rockbridge, Illinois
 Rockbridge, Missouri
 Rockbridge, Ohio
 Rockbridge, Wisconsin
 Rockbridge (community), Wisconsin, an unincorporated community
 Rockbridge County, Virginia

Other uses
Rock Bridge High School
USS Rockbridge (APA-228)